Izabela Dylewska-Światowiak (born March 16, 1968 in Nowy Dwór Mazowiecki) is a Polish sprint canoer who competed from 1987 to 1997. Competing in three Summer Olympics, she won two bronze medals in the K-1 500 m event, earning them in 1988 and 1992.

Dylewska's first success on the international kayaking scene occurred at the 1987 World Championships when she won a silver medal in the women's K-1 500 m event, which would prove to be her best event over the ensuing years. Dylewska won a second world championships' silver medal in the K-1 500 m in 1989.

In 1995, Dylewska partnered with Elżbieta Urbańczyk to win the silver medal at the 1995 World Championships in the women's K-2 500 m. Dylewska's partnership with Urbańczyk would result in two gold medals at the 1997 European Championships (K-2 200 m and K-2 1000 m), as well as a silver medal (K-2 200 m) and bronze medal (K-2 1000 m) at the 1997 World Championships.

References
DatabaseOlympics.com profile

1968 births
Canoeists at the 1988 Summer Olympics
Canoeists at the 1992 Summer Olympics
Canoeists at the 1996 Summer Olympics
Living people
Olympic canoeists of Poland
Olympic bronze medalists for Poland
Polish female canoeists
Olympic medalists in canoeing
People from Nowy Dwór Mazowiecki
ICF Canoe Sprint World Championships medalists in kayak
Sportspeople from Masovian Voivodeship
Medalists at the 1992 Summer Olympics
Medalists at the 1988 Summer Olympics